Albert Dent may refer to:

Albert W. Dent (1904–1984), administrator of Dillard University and Flint-Goodridge Hospital in New Orleans
Albert Dent, British naval officer for whom Dent Island (Queensland) was named